The term Europhobia can refer to three different ideas:

Hard euroscepticism, hostility or opposition to European integration, European identity, or the European Union
Anti-Europeanism, hostility or opposition to Europeanism or the values of the European Union